Keith Anderson (born 1968) is an American country musician.

Keith Anderson may also refer to:

 Keith Anderson (actor) (died 2007), British television actor
 Keith Anderson (saxophonist) (born 1970), American jazz saxophonist
 Keith Anderson or Bob Andy (1944–2020), Jamaican reggae artist
 Keith Anderson (politician) (1916–1965), Australian politician
 Keith Anderson (runner) (born 1957), British runner
  Keith Anderson (Good Times), character in the 1970s sitcom
 Keith Vincent Anderson (1898–1929), Australian pilot